Daniel John Crothers (born January 3, 1957) is a justice of the North Dakota Supreme Court.  Daniel John Crothers was born in Fargo, North Dakota in 1957. Crothers was raised in Fargo, American Samoa, and Albuquerque, New Mexico. He graduated from the University of North Dakota in 1979 and the University of North Dakota School of Law in 1982.  He was appointed to the Supreme Court in 2005.

Career
1982–1983 – clerked for the Hon. Ramon Lopez of the New Mexico Court of Appeals
1983–1984 – served as Walsh County Assistant State's Attorney
1984–1985 – private practice in Santa Fe, New Mexico
1987–2005 – private practice in Fargo
2001–2002 – president of the State Bar Association of North Dakota
2005 – Governor John Hoeven appointed Crothers to the North Dakota Supreme Court. Crothers was elected to an unexpired four-year term in 2008, and re-elected to a ten-year term on the Court in 2012.

Memberships and Committees
Justice Crothers was President of the State Bar Association of North Dakota from 2001 to 2002. Crothers currently serves on North Dakota's Committee on Judiciary Standards. He chairs the North Dakota Court Services Administration Committee. He is a member of the ABA Center for Professional Responsibility Policy Implementation Committee. Crothers was formerly chair of the ABA Standing Committee on Client Protection.

References

External links
Daniel John Crothers biography
North Dakota Supreme Court website

Justices of the North Dakota Supreme Court
University of North Dakota alumni
Politicians from Fargo, North Dakota
Politicians from Santa Fe, New Mexico
1957 births
Living people
21st-century American judges
Lawyers from Fargo, North Dakota